Dhok Nagyal is situated between the villages of Ghick Badhal, Cheena, Sasral, Gharmala and Kauntreela. It lies in the Kaniat Khalil Union Council in Rawalpindi District. 100% of the inhabitants are Nagyal Rajputs who are an offshoot of Dogra Rajputs.

It is not big village, but very small community because all are pure nagyal and no any other cast lie in dhoke nagyal.

Four Dogra brothers came to settle in this region prior to Akbar's reign. One brother settled at Dhok Nagyal, second brother settled in Ghick Badhal, third brother settled in Bagwal and fourth brother settled at Qutbal.

Centuries ago majority the land between Yatsar, Ratyal, Ghick Badhal, Dora Badhal, Gharmala, Cheena, Sasral, Bagwal, Qutbal up to Daultala belonged to these four brothers.

Their cousins the Minhas Rajputs settled in Chakwal which is next to Daultala.

Both these clans took up agriculture. Before partition of India and Pakistan the Dogra Maharaja of Jammu and Kashmir visited Dhok Nagyal to meet their bloodlines before making a decision.

Populated places in Rawalpindi District